Khaldi may refer to:
 Khaldi (god)
 Chalybes (Khaldi), a historical tribe in Anatolia
 Chaldia (Khaldia), a historical location of Anatolia
 Ishmael Khaldi (born 1971), Israeli diplomat

See also
 Chaldean (disambiguation)